"Vifta med händerna" (released as "Throw Your Hands Up" on later edition of LOL album) is a song by Swedish musician Basshunter, released on 13 December 2006 by Warner Music Sweden. "Vifta med händerna" appears on Basshunter second studio album, LOL <(^^,)>. The single peaked at number 25 on Swedish singles chart.

Release

Basshunter's previous single, "Jingle Bells", had been released two months earlier on 13 October 2006. "Vifta med händerna" is hip-hop song which lasts three minutes and five seconds. It was done in collaboration with music duo from Örebro Patrik & Lillen. The song was written and produced by Basshunter. "Vifta med händerna" was mastered by Björn Engelman in Cutting Room studio. Antti Niemelä from Findance.com described Patrik & Lillen rapping as fast and mentioned that the combination of Swedish-language rap and dance reminds Swedish group Oktan. Niemelä added that good raps would have needed better-functioning musical background. Song was released as "Throw Your Hands Up" on later edition of LOL album. The next single was released on 5 October 2007 – new version of "Vi sitter i Ventrilo och spelar DotA" released under the name "DotA".

Music video
A music video was produced to promote the single.

Chart performance
"Vifta med händerna" entered Swedish singles chart at number 25 on 30 November 2006 reaching a peak before it was released as single. It stayed on chart for ten weeks. Even though "Vifta med händerna" was released two months later, "Jingle Bells" entered Swedish chart only on 14 December. In 3rd week of 2007 "Vifta med händerna" debuted on Finnish singles chart and stayed at number seven for two weeks before quitting the chart.

Track listing

Personnel
Credits
 Basshunter – writer, producer
 Björn Engelman – mastering

Charts

Notes

References

External links
 

Basshunter songs
2006 singles
Songs written by Basshunter
2006 songs
Warner Music Sweden singles
Swedish-language songs
Song recordings produced by Basshunter